Poly Real Estate Group Co., Ltd. is a Chinese real estate developer, and a subsidiary of state-owned China Poly Group. It principally engaged in the design, development, construction and sale of residential and commercial properties, as well as the provision of property management services. It is engaged in residential and commercial property development and property management services in China.

Poly Real Estate is headquartered in Guangzhou, Guangdong Province. It was listed on the Shanghai Stock Exchange on 31 July 2006. Poly Real Estate is a consistent of blue chip indexes SSE 50 Index, FTSE China A50 Index and other indexes.

In 2015 Poly Real Estate launched Poly Global, a subsidiary that focuses on international developments. Poly Global began its operations initially in Australia as Poly Australia, and since then operations have expanded into the UK and USA. Poly Global's headquarters is in Hong Kong with offices in Sydney, Melbourne, Brisbane, London and Los Angeles.

Land Holdings
As of September 2009 Poly Real Estate had land reserves totaling 23.5 million square meters.

Shareholders
, the largest and controlling shareholder of the company was state-owned China Poly Group, which owned 2.82% shares directly and via subsidiary "Poly Southern Group Co., Ltd." for an additional 38.05%. The Chinese Central Government also owned additional shares via China Securities Finance and Central Huijin. Other entities that owned >3% shares were private equity funds of Taikang Life Insurance (4.15%) and AnBang Property & Causality Insurance (3.41%).

See also
Poly Property, sister company

References

External links
 

Companies in the CSI 100 Index
Companies listed on the Shanghai Stock Exchange
Real estate companies of China
Chinese companies established in 1992
Real estate companies established in 1992
Government-owned companies of China
Companies based in Guangzhou
China Poly Group